The 2020 Le Mans Cup, known as the 2020 Michelin Le Mans Cup under sponsorship, was the fifth season of the Le Mans Cup. It began on 18 July at the Circuit Paul Ricard and finished on 1 November at Algarve International Circuit. The series was open to Le Mans Prototypes in the LMP3 class, and grand tourer sports cars in the GT3 class. The 2020 calendar was released on 4 April 2020.

This season ran with a newly updated 2020 ACO LMP3 specification, including an uplift of ~35bhp in power and to 5.6 litres from 5.0 litres. An issue with fuel consumption came to light after Free Practice sessions; the spec Nissan VK56 / X-Trac drivetrain, homologated and supplied through Oreca, used more fuel than was predicted. To mitigate this in the first race an additional mandatory pit stop was added, along with adjustments to relevant mandatory stop times and driver stint rules.

Calendar
The 2020 calendar was released on 4 April 2020. All races supported the 2020 European Le Mans Series except the Le Mans round, which was part of the 2020 24 Hours of Le Mans weekend.

The Barcelona round was moved to Paul Ricard due to the COVID-19 situation in Barcelona.

Entries

LMP3

GT3

Race results
Bold indicates the overall winner.

Standings
Points are awarded according to the following structure:

LMP3 Teams Championship

GT3 Teams Championship

LMP3 Drivers Championship

GT3 Drivers Championship

References

External links
 

2020 in motorsport
2020 in European sport